
Gmina Sułów is a rural gmina (administrative district) in Zamość County, Lublin Voivodeship, in eastern Poland.

Villages
Gmina Sułów contains the villages and settlements of Deszkowice Drugie, Deszkowice Pierwsze, Kawęczyn-Kolonia, Kitów, Michalów, Rozłopy, Rozłopy-Kolonia, Sąsiadka, Sułów, Sułów-Kolonia, Sułówek, Sułowiec, Tworyczów and Źrebce, as well as Brzezina, Czajki, Czternastka, Doliny, Gaj, Góry, Kolonia, Kolonia Dworska, Kolonia Środkowa, Kątek, Lipiny, Majdan, Mule, Nawsie, Pałac, Pod Szosą, Polówka, Popówka, Rutki, Rynek, Stara Wieś, Starowieś, and Wygon.

Neighbouring gminas
Gmina Sułów is bordered by the gminas of Nielisz, Radecznica, Rudnik, Szczebrzeszyn and Turobin.

References

Polish official population figures 2006

Sulow
Zamość County